B Surya Prakash Rao (born 3 October 1948) is a former Indian cricket umpire. He stood in one ODI game in 1996.

See also
 List of One Day International cricket umpires

References

1948 births
Living people
Indian One Day International cricket umpires
People from Machilipatnam